Harold Cooke (1895–1966) was a British field hockey player. He competed in the men's tournament at the 1920 Summer Olympics, and was part of the gold medal winning team.

References

External links
 

1895 births
1966 deaths
British male field hockey players
Olympic field hockey players of Great Britain
Field hockey players at the 1920 Summer Olympics
Sportspeople from Leicestershire
Olympic gold medallists for Great Britain
English Olympic medallists
Olympic medalists in field hockey
Medalists at the 1920 Summer Olympics